was a Japanese writer and activist.

She won the 1973 Ramon Magsaysay Award, among the most prestigious awards in Asia, for publicizing writings about Minamata disease, which was extremely controversial at the time.

Select works
 Paradise in the Sea of Sorrow: Our Minamata Disease (1969) translated into English by Livia Monnet and into German by Ursula Graefe.
 Story of the Sea of Camellias (1976) translated into English by Livia Monnet
 Lake of Heaven (1997) translated into English by Bruce Allen.
 Anima no tori (Birds of Spirit) (1999) 
 Shiranui: A Contemporary Noh Drama translated into English by Bruce Allen.

References

External links
 Michiko Ishumure (sic), unesco.org via archive.org. Retrieved 10 February 2018.
 
 
 

1927 births
2018 deaths
Japanese environmentalists
Japanese women environmentalists
Japanese women activists
Japanese non-fiction writers
Japanese women writers
Minamata disease
Ramon Magsaysay Award winners
Writers from Kumamoto Prefecture